A monkey stick (also called a mendoza, mendozer, Murrumbidgee river rattler, lagerphone or zob stick) is a traditional English percussion instrument, used in folk music. The origins of the name are not known but it is believed to stem from an association with Roma, Spanish and Italian buskers who were popular in London in the Victorian era. Alternatively, the name "Monkey Stick" could come from modern practice, in homage to the trained monkeys formerly used by buskers to solicit money from passersby. Some musicians have taken to fixing a small stuffed toy monkey to the tops of their instruments.

The instrument is constructed from a stout pole with metal "jingles" fastened at intervals along the shaft. These are commonly beer-bottle tops with a 1 inch washer in between the tops and the shaft to enhance the quality of the sound. Originally the end of the shaft is believed to have been covered with a rag to give some protection to the floor. A boot that might be attached to the base of the pole is a recent 'Zob Stick' addition.

When played on a wooden floor (common in ale-houses), the sound produced is a combination of a bass drum and tambourine. It can also be played with an additional small notched or serrated stick held in the other hand, allowing it to not only be shaken or hammered onto the ground, but also "bowed" to produce a combined clicking and rattling sound. Bands such as Groanbox, Zapoppin' and Dr. Busker have incorporated the monkey stick into their recordings and live shows.

Other names and versions
In Australia, this instrument constructed with beer-bottle tops is known as a lagerphone. The same name and construction is found in New Zealand. The town of Brooweena in Queensland, Australia claims to hold the unofficial record when 134 people simultaneously played the lagerphone in 2009.

In Newfoundland, it is referred to as an "ugly stick". In the Dutch province of Friesland this type of instrument is known as a 'kuttepiel'. In the American upper-Midwestern states of Minnesota and Wisconsin, the closely related stumpf fiddle or pogocello originated in Czech communities and adds small cymbals, strings, and a drum. A similar instrument, the batih, is found in Ukraine.

The "zob stick" variation of this instrument was constructed and named in 1968 by percussionist and songwriter Keef Trouble of the band Brett Marvin and the Thunderbolts and Terry Dactyl and the Dinosaurs, and included a sprung-boot attached to the bottom of the pole and a metal sleeve round its centre, to be hit with a serrated wooden stick. It is now, with the term ‘Lagerphone’, the most commonly used name for this instrument. The term 'zob' was taken from the British naval slang term for "penis".

See also
Turkish crescent
Bush band
Ugly stick
Boomba

References

External links
Groanbox
Brett Marvin and the Thunderbolts (Web Site featuring Keef Trouble and the original 'Zob Stick'.)
 The Lagerphone Pages by Keith Sayers (Canberra February 2014)

Hand percussion
European percussion instruments
English musical instruments
Metal percussion instruments
Oceanian percussion instruments
Percussion instruments played with specialised beaters
Shaken idiophones or rattles
Street performance
Uses of boots